Kaadhal Solla Vandhen is a 2010 Indian Tamil-language romance film written and directed by Boopathy Pandian, which stars Balaji Balakrishnan of Kana Kaanum Kaalangal fame and Meghana Raj in lead and Arya in a guest role. The film, previously titled as Naanum En Sandhyavum and Naan Avalai Sandhitha Pozhudhu, is produced by S3 Films and features music scored by Yuvan Shankar Raja. It released on 13 August 2010.

Plot 
Nanu Prabhu is a happy-go-lucky youth who joins in a college and falls in love at first sight with his senior Sandhya. Despite the fact that she is older than him, he does not care about it and pursues to woo her. He is aided by his best friend Petha Perumal, a lazy glutton who drools over food, in his love quest. Sandhya dismisses his romantic pursuits and looks upon and mingles with him only as a friend. They travel in the same bus to the college and become good friends. Soon, trouble starts in the form of Sandhya's batchmates who are in love with her; they do not approve of her relationship with Prabhu. This puts them and Prabhu at loggerheads. Their clash, however, proves to be an advantage for Prabhu, as it causes Sandhya to bond closer with him. After a series of events, Sandhya eventually reciprocates his love and is about to propose back to him when Prabhu is hit by a speeding van and dies on the spot. Sandhya then becomes hysterical and cries uncontrollably, with a dead Prabhu lying on her lap in front of the crowd that had just gathered at the scene of the accident. Five years later, Sandhya becomes a teacher in the same college where she and Prabhu studied, unmarried and living with the memories of Prabhu.

Cast 
 Balaji Balakrishnan as Nanu Prabhu
 Meghana Raj as Sandhya
 Karthik Sabesh as Petha Perumal
 R. Sundarrajan as Nanu Prabhu's father
 Ashwin as Singh
Thambi Ramaiah as College Principal
Arya as Doctor (Guest appearance)

Production 
In early 2008, Boopathy Pandian first announced a project titled Naanum En Sandhyavum (Me and my Sandhya),  with which he was planning to introduce his younger sibling Arjun Prabhu as an actor. He signed him for the lead male role in the film, whilst Malayalam actress Meera Nandan was approached to essay the lead female character called Sandhya, for which reportedly also Kajal Aggarwal, Bhama and Vedhika were considered. Yuvan Shankar Raja was announced as the music director for film. Following the announcement, however, there were no more news or any further details disclosed in the media and the film got shelved.

In early 2010 then, reports claimed that the director had completed a film titled Naan Avalai Sandhitha Pozhudhu (When I met her), starring newcomers and featuring Yuvan Shankar Raja's music. Boopathy Pandian had restarted the projects, changing its title and replacing the lead couple by two relatively unknown artists; Balaji Balakrishnan, who starred in the popular STAR Vijay television series Kana Kaanum Kaalangal and also appeared in the N. Linguswamy-produced 2009 film Pattalam, was signed as the male protagonist, whilst Meghana Raj, daughter of actors Sunderraj and Pramila, who was also earlier signed by K. Balachander for his long-delayed production venture Krishnaleelai, was roped in to enact the role of Sandhya. The title of the film was later changed again to Kaadhal Solla Vandhen as disclosed by Balaji on his Facebook site. The film's shooting was primarily carried on in and around Perambalur, with major portions being filmed at the Dhanalakshmi Srinivasan Engineering College.

Soundtrack 

The film score and soundtrack are composed by Yuvan Shankar Raja, working together with director Boopathy Pandian for the first time. The soundtrack album, which was released on 16 June 2010 at Sathyam Cinemas, Chennai, consists of 5 songs, all of which being solo numbers and notably featuring only male voices, with the fourth song "Saamy Varugudhu" being sung by real Hindu priests (poosaris). The film did feature another song as part of the film score that was not included in the soundtrack.

Not in the soundtrack
Other music featured in the film includes:
 Yedho Ondru Unnai, sung by Haricharan, composed by Yuvan Shankar Raja

Reception
Behindwoods wrote "Boopathy Pandiyan’s Kaadal Solla Vanden is not the time pass material he has produced before. It’s much less entertaining than its earlier counterparts and the fact that the storyline has very little scope for fast-paced narration leaves you stifle a yawn quite often". Rediff wrote "Now, if only the director had shown some logic and rationale in the story instead of re-working several other earlier films, this movie might have lived up to the promise it generates in the first half". The Indian Express wrote "humour in the lines, fun-filled moments, and a racy pace which keeps the audience engaged for most part".

References

External links 
 

2010 films
2010s Tamil-language films
Indian romantic drama films
2010 romantic drama films
Films shot in Tiruchirappalli
Films scored by Yuvan Shankar Raja
Films directed by Boopathy Pandian